Football Calcio Dilettantistica Sporting Bellinzago (or simply Sporting Bellinzago) was an Italian football club, based in Bellinzago Novarese, Piedmont.

History
The club was founded in 2012.

It was promoted for the first time to Serie D in the 2013-14 season.
It was promoted for the first time to Lega Pro in the 2015-2016 season, when it won the championship with 86 points.

Colors and badge
The colors of the team are yellow and blue.

References

External links
https://web.archive.org/web/20140812220302/http://www.sportingbellinzago.it/

2012 establishments in Italy
Association football clubs established in 2012
Football clubs in Piedmont and Aosta Valley